James Barrett (July 31, 1710 – April 11, 1779) was an American colonel in the Concord, Massachusetts militia during the Battles of Lexington and Concord that began the American Revolutionary War. His farm was the storage site of all the town of Concord's militia gunpowder, weapons and two pairs of prized bronze cannons, according to secret British intelligence.

On the morning of April 19, 1775, the British Regulars were ordered by General Thomas Gage to march from Boston to the town of Concord, about 20 miles inland, and seize the cannon and raid the arsenal at the provincial farm. The British met resistance at both Lexington, Massachusetts and Concord. Before the British arrived and searched, the stores had been concealed in a field nearby, and the British never found them. He is buried in Old Hill Burying Ground, Concord, Massachusetts.

References 

1710 births
1779 deaths
Continental Army officers from Massachusetts
People from Concord, Massachusetts
American military personnel of the Seven Years' War
People of Massachusetts in the French and Indian War
People of colonial Massachusetts
Burials at Old Hill Burying Ground